Alison Joy Bielski  (née Prosser, previously Treverton-Jones; 24 November 1925 – 9 July 2014), was 
a Welsh poet and writer, whose works included the Flower Legends of Wales and Tales and Traditions of Tenby. 
She has also published several booklets on local history, including Flower Legends of Wales in 1974, Tales and Traditions of Tenby in 1981 and The Story of St Mellons in 1985. Between 1969 and 1974 Bielski was also the honorary joint secretary of the English-language section of Yr Academi Gymreig, the national association of writers in Wales.

Early life and education

She was born on 24 November 1925 in Newport, Monmouthshire, Wales. Her family, the Morris Prossers had lived in the district around Tintern Abbey, Monmouthshire since the 11th century.

Bielski attended Newport High School until she was 16. She then went on to attend secretarial training before becoming the private secretary to the press officer of the Bristol Aeroplane Company in 1945. Later she worked in her family's engineering business. Her first marriage was to Dennis Treverton-Jones in 1948, which ended with her husband's death in 1950. They had one son, Ronald. She then took a new position as a welfare secretary to the British Red Cross in Cardiff. She married Anthony Bielski in 1955 and became a "writer-housewife". They had one daughter together, Helen.

Career
Bielski's poems were first published by small printers. She made her debut with Twentieth-Century Flood, published by Howard Sergeant on the Outposts imprint in 1964, and four years later by Shapes and Colours, published by the Triskel Press in Wales. Her first hardbacked book was Across the Burning Sand in 1970.

During her lifetime her works were considered too "modern", too "experimental", too "difficult" because punctuation was reduced to a minimum and no upper-case letters were used in her works.

Her works include numerous collections and she regularly contributed to magazines. She often drew inspiration from Welsh folklore and mythology. Her poetry has been published in India, the United Kingdom, the United States, and many European countries. Her book The Story of the Welsh Dragon, was chosen by a panel chaired by Lord Snowdon as one of the official souvenirs on the Investiture of the Prince of Wales in 1969.

Death
She died on 9 July 2014 and was cremated at Thornhill Crematorium in Cardiff on 24 July. She had one son and daughter, six grand children and one great-grandson.

Bibliography
 Twentieth Century Flood 1964
 Story of the Welsh Dragon (with Claude Page) 1969 
 Across the Burning Sand 1970 
 20 monogrampoems 1971
 Flower legends of Wales 1972 
 Zodiacpoems (with Peter Barnfield and Ginny Barnfield) 1973  
 Shapes and Colours 1973 
 Eve 1973 
 Mermaid Poems 1974 
 Flower Legends of the Wye Valley 1974 
 The Lovetree 1974 
 Mobiles 1979 
 Discovering Islands 1979 
 Seth: A Poem Sequence 1980  
 Tales and Traditions of Old Tenby 1981  
 Night Sequence 1981   
 Sacramental Sonnets: a Poem Cycle, 1982 2003 
 Eagles, 1983  
 Story of St.Mellons 1985 
 That Crimson Flame 1996 
 The Green-eyed Pool 1998 
 One of Our Skylarks 2010

References 

1925 births
2014 deaths
20th-century Welsh poets
21st-century Welsh poets
20th-century Welsh women writers
21st-century Welsh women writers
21st-century Welsh writers
People from Newport, Wales
People from Tenby
Welsh women poets
People educated at Newport High School
British local historians
Secretaries
Bristol Aeroplane Company
Red Cross personnel